Jerald Christopher Moore (born November 20, 1974) is a former professional American football player who played running back for four seasons for the New Orleans Saints and the St. Louis Rams.

1974 births
Living people
People from Houston
Players of American football from Texas
American football running backs
Oklahoma Sooners football players
St. Louis Rams players
New Orleans Saints players